The National Union of Road Transport Workers is an independent Nigerian trade union that serves the interests of transport workers  in the road transport sector, by calling for collective obtaining and pushing for social stability for all workers in the transport sector as defined in its constitution.

The union was founded in 1978, when the government of Nigeria merged the following unions:

 Amalgamated Union of Lagos Municipal Bus Workers 
 Ance Transport Service Workers' Union
 Arab Trans Workers' Union
 Benson Transport Workers' Union
 Cross River State Transport and Allied Workers' Union
 H. Safieddine Transport Limited Workers' Union
 Hope Rising Drivers' Union
 Ikot Ekpene Divisional Transport Workers' Union
 Jam Iyyan Alhin Diraibobiw Arewa Northern Transport Workers' Union
 Mid-West Line and Armels Transport Workers' Union
 M/S Fawaz (Nigeria) Limited and Allied Workers' Union
 Rivers State Transport Corporation and Allied Workers' Union
 Tractors Drivers' Union
 Trans Continental (Nigeria) Ltd. Workers' Union

The union affiliated to the Nigeria Labour Congress.  By 1988, it had 30,000 members, and by 2005, this had grown to 96,000.

The union raises fund through several methods, but the largest of these is through support and willful contribution of union funds.
The core functions of the union is to protect the rights of workers in the transport sector.
Entry into the union is voluntary, however the dues collected are used to run functions in the union and support members. 
The youth department under the women league ensure youth programs to educate and sensitise members on good service delivery and customer relation.

The union has been known for controversial practices including corruption, extortion, and nepotism, exposed by the American-British journalist Louis Theroux in his 2010 documentary film.

References

Trade unions in Nigeria
Trade unions established in 1978
Road transport trade unions